Extracellular polymeric substances (EPSs) are natural polymers of high molecular weight secreted by microorganisms into their environment. EPSs establish the functional and structural integrity of biofilms, and are considered the fundamental component that determines the physicochemical properties of a biofilm. EPS in the matrix of biofilms provides compositional support and protection of microbial communities from the harsh environments. Components of EPS can be of different classes of polysaccharides, lipids, nucleic acids, proteins, Lipopolysaccharides, and minerals.

Components 
EPSs are mostly composed of polysaccharides (exopolysaccharides) and proteins, but include other macromolecules such as DNA, lipids and humic substances.  EPSs are the construction material of bacterial settlements and either remain attached to the cell's outer surface, or are secreted into its growth medium. These compounds are important in biofilm formation and cells' attachment to surfaces. EPSs constitute 50% to 90% of a biofilm's total organic matter.

Exopolysaccharides (also sometimes abbreviated EPSs; EPS sugars thereafter) are the sugar-based parts of EPS. Microorganisms synthesize a wide spectrum of multifunctional polysaccharides including intracellular polysaccharides, structural polysaccharides and extracellular polysaccharides or exopolysaccharides. Exopolysaccharides generally consist of monosaccharides and some non-carbohydrate substituents (such as acetate, pyruvate, succinate, and phosphate). Owing to the wide diversity in composition, exopolysaccharides have found diverse applications in various food and pharmaceutical industries. Many microbial EPS sugars provide properties that are almost identical to the gums currently in use. With innovative approaches, efforts are underway to supersede the traditionally used plant and algal gums by their microbial counterparts. Moreover, considerable progress has been made in discovering and developing new microbial EPS sugars that possess novel industrial applications. Levan produced by Pantoea agglomerans ZMR7 was reported to decrease the viability of rhabdomyosarcoma (RD) and breast cancer (MDA) cells compared with untreated cancer cells. In addition, it has high antiparasitic activity against the promastigote of Leishmania tropica. In the1960s and 1970s, the presence of exopolysaccharides in the matrix of plaques associated with tooth decay was investigated. In the field of paleomicrobiology, dental biofilms and their EPS components provide scientists with information about the composition of ancient microbial and host biomolecules as well as the diet of the host.

The minerals, results of biomineralization processes regulated by the environment or bacteria, are also essential components of the EPS. They provide structural integrity to biofilm matrix and act as a scaffold to protect bacterial cells from shear forces and antimicrobial chemicals. The minerals in EPS were found to contribute to morphogenesis of bacteria and the structural integrity of the matrix. For example, in Bacillus. subtilis, Mycobacterium smegmatis, and Pseudomonas aeruginosa biofilms calcite (CaCO3) contributes to the integrity of the matrix. The minerals also associate with medical conditions. In the biofilms of Proteus mirabilis, Proteus vulgaris, and Providencia rettgeri, the minerals calcium and magnesium cause catheter encrustation.

EPS and Biofilm

Biofilm Formation 
The first step in the formation of Biofilms is adhesion. The initial bacterial adhesion to surfaces involves the adhesin–receptor interactions. Certain polysaccharides, lipids and proteins in the matrix function as the adhesive agents. EPS also promotes cell–cell cohesion (including interspecies recognition) to facilitate microbial aggregation and biofilm formation. In general, the EPS-based matrix mediates biofilm assembly as follows. First, the EPS formation takes place at the site of adhesion, it will be either produced on bacterial surfaces or secreted on the surface of attachment, and form an initial polymeric matrix promoting microbial colonization and cell clustering. Next, continuous production of EPS further expands the matrix in 3 dimensions while forming a core of bacterial cells. The bacterial core provides a supporting framework, and facilitates the development of 3D clusters and aggregation of microcolonies. Studies on P. aeruginosa, B. subtilis, V. cholerae, and S. mutans suggested that the transition from initial cell clustering to microcolony appears to be conserved among different biofilm-forming model organisms. As an example, S. mutans produces an exoenzymes, called glucosyltransferases (Gtfs), which synthesize glucans in situ using host diet sugars as substrates. Gtfs even bind to the bacteria that do not synthesize Gtfs, and therefore, facilitate interspecies and interkingdom coadhesion.

Significance of EPS in Biofilms 
Afterwards, as biofilm becomes established, EPS provides physical stability and resistance to mechanical removal, antimicrobials, and host immunity. Exopolysaccharides and environmental DNA  (eDNA) contribute to viscoelasticity of mature biofilms so that detachment of biofilm from the substratum will be challenging even under sustained fluid shear stress or high mechanical pressure. In addition to mechanical resistance, EPS also promotes protection against antimicrobials and enhanced drug tolerance. Antimicrobials cannot diffuse through the EPS barrier, resulting in limited drug access into the deeper layers of the biofilm. Moreover, positively charged agents will bind to negatively charged EPS contributing to the antimicrobial tolerance of biofilms, and enabling inactivation or degradation of antimicrobials by enzymes present in biofilm matrix. EPS also functions as local nutrient reservoir of various biomolecules, such as fermentable polysaccharides. A study on V. cholerae in 2017 suggested that due to osmotic pressure differences in V. cholerae biofilms, the microbial colonies physically swell, therefore maximizing their contact with nutritious surfaces and thus, nutrient uptake.

Function 
Capsular exopolysaccharides can protect pathogenic bacteria against desiccation and predation, and contribute to their pathogenicity. Sessile bacteria fixed and aggregated in biofilms are less vulnerable compared to drifting planktonic bacteria, as the EPS matrix is able to act as a protective diffusion barrier. The physical and chemical characteristics of bacterial cells can be affected by EPS composition, influencing factors such as cellular recognition, aggregation, and adhesion in their natural environments. Furthermore, the EPS layer acts as a nutrient trap, facilitating bacterial growth. The exopolysaccharides of some strains of lactic acid bacteria, e.g., Lactococcus lactis subsp. cremoris, contribute a gelatinous texture to fermented milk products (e.g., Viili), and these polysaccharides are also digestible. An example of the industrial use of exopolysaccharides is the application of dextran in panettone and other breads in the bakery industry.

Apart from negative contributions of EPS in biofilms, EPS can also contribute to some beneficial functions. For example, B. subtilis has gained interest for its probiotic properties due to its biofilm which allows it to effectively maintain a favorable microenvironmnet in the gastrointestinal tract. In order to survive the passage through the upper gastrointestinal tract, B. subtilis produces an extracellular matrix that protects it from stressful environments such as the highly acidic environment in the stomach. In B. subtilis, the protein matrix component, TasA, and the exopolysaccharide have both been shown to be essential for effective plant-root colonization in Arabidopsis and tomato plants. It was also suggested that TasA plays an important role in mediating interspecies aggregation with streptococci.

Ecology 
Exopolysaccharides can facilitate the attachment of nitrogen-fixing bacteria to plant roots and soil particles, which mediates a symbiotic relationship. This is important for colonization of roots and the rhizosphere, which is a key component of soil food webs and nutrient cycling in ecosystems. It also allows for successful invasion and infection of the host plant. Bacterial extracellular polymeric substances can aid in bioremediation of heavy metals as they have the capacity to adsorb metal cations, among other dissolved substances. This can be useful in the treatment of wastewater systems, as biofilms are able to bind to and remove metals such as copper, lead, nickel, and cadmium. The binding affinity and metal specificity of EPSs varies, depending on polymer composition as well as factors such as concentration and pH. In a geomicrobiological context, EPSs have been observed to affect precipitation of minerals, particularly carbonates. EPS may also bind to and trap particles in biofilm suspensions, which can restrict dispersion and element cycling. Sediment stability can be increased by EPS, as it influences cohesion, permeability, and erosion of the sediment. There is evidence that the adhesion and metal-binding ability of EPS affects mineral leaching rates in both environmental and industrial contexts. These interactions between EPS and the abiotic environment allow for EPS to have a large impact on biogeochemical cycling. Predator-prey interactions between biofilms and bacterivores, such as the soil-dwelling nematode Caenorhabditis elegans, had been extensively studied. Via the production of sticky matrix and formation of aggregates, Yersinia pestis biofilms can prevent feeding by obstructing the mouth of C. elegans. Moreover, Pseudomonas aeruginosa biofilms can impede the slithering motility of C. elegans, termed as 'quagmire phenotype', resulting in trapping of C. elegans within the biofilms and preventing the exploration of nematodes to feed on susceptible biofilms. This significantly reduced the ability of predator to feed and reproduce, thereby promoting the survival of biofilms.

Novel Industrial Use 
Due to the growing need to find a more efficient and environmentally friendly alternative to conventional waste removal methods, industries are paying more attention to the function of bacteria and their EPS sugars in bioremediation.

Researchers found that adding EPS sugars from cyanobacteria to wastewaters removes heavy metals such as copper, cadmium and lead. EPS sugars alone can physically interact with these heavy metals and take them in through biosorption. The efficiency of removal can be optimized by treating the EPS sugars with different acids or bases before adding them to wastewater. Some contaminated soils contain high levels of polycyclic aromatic hydrocarbons (PAHs); EPSs from the bacterium Zoogloea sp. and the fungus Aspergillus niger, are efficient at removing these toxic compounds. EPSs contain enzymes such as oxidoreductase and hydrolase, which are capable of degrading PAHs. The amount of PAH degradation depends on the concentration of EPSs added to the soil. This method proves to be low cost and highly efficient.

In recent years, EPS sugars from marine bacteria have been found to speed up the cleanup of oil spills. During the Deepwater Horizon oil spill in 2010, these EPS-producing bacteria were able to grow and multiply rapidly. It was later found that their EPS sugars dissolved the oil and formed oil aggregates on the ocean surface, which sped up the cleaning process. These oil aggregates also provided a valuable source of nutrients for other marine microbial communities. This let scientists modify and optimize the use of EPS sugars to clean up oil spills.

List of Extracellular polymeric substances

 acetan (Acetobacter xylinum)
 alginate (Azotobacter vinelandii)
 cellulose (Acetobacter xylinum)
 chitosan (Mucorales spp.)
 curdlan (Alcaligenes faecalis var. myxogenes)
 cyclosophorans (Agrobacterium spp., Rhizobium spp. and Xanthomonas spp.)
 dextran (Leuconostoc mesenteroides, Leuconostoc dextranicum and Lactobacillus hilgardii)
 emulsan (Acinetobacter calcoaceticus)
 galactoglucopolysaccharides (Achromobacter spp., Agrobacterium radiobacter, Pseudomonas marginalis, Rhizobium spp. and Zooglea' spp.)
 galactosaminogalactan (Aspergillus spp.)
 gellan (Aureomonas elodea and Sphingomonas paucimobilis)
 glucuronan (Sinorhizobium meliloti)
 N-acetylglucosamine (Staphylococcus epidermidis)
 N-acetyl-heparosan (Escherichia coli)
 hyaluronic acid (Streptococcus equi)
 indican (Beijerinckia indica)
 kefiran (Lactobacillus hilgardii)
 lentinan (Lentinus elodes)
 levan (Alcaligenes viscosus, Zymomonas mobilis, Bacillus subtilis)
 pullulan (Aureobasidium pullulans)
 scleroglucan (Sclerotium rolfsii, Sclerotium delfinii and Sclerotium glucanicum)
 schizophyllan (Schizophylum commune)
 stewartan (Pantoea stewartii subsp. stewartii)
 succinoglycan (Alcaligenes faecalis var. myxogenes, Sinorhizobium meliloti)
 xanthan (Xanthomonas campestris)
 welan (Alcaligenes'' spp.)

New Approaches to Target Biofilms 
The application of Nanoparticles (NPs) are one of novel promising techniques to target biofilms due to their high surface-area-to-volume ratio, their ability to penetrate to the deeper layers of biofilms and the capacity to releasing antimicrobial agents in a controlled way. Studying NP-EPS interactions could provide deeper understanding on how to develop more effective nanoparticles. "smart release" nanocarriers that can penetrate biofilms and be triggered by pathogenic microenvironments to deliver drugs or multifunctional compounds, such as catalytic nanoparticles to aptamers, dendrimers, and bioactive peptides) have been developed to disrupt the EPS and the viability or metabolic activity of the embedded bacteria. Some factors that would alter the potentials of the NP to transport antimicrobial agents into the biofilm include physicochemical interactions of the NPs with EPS components, the characteristics of the water spaces (pores) within the EPS matrix and the EPS matrix viscosity. Size and surface properties (charge and functional groups) of the NPs are the major determinants of the penetration in and the interaction with the EPS. Another potential antibiofilm strategy is phage therapy. Bacteriophages, viruses that invade specific bacterial host cells, were suggested to be effective agents in penetrating biofilms. In order to reach the maximum efficacy to eradicate biofilms, therapeutic strategies need to target both the biofilm matrix components as well as the embedded microorganisms to target the complex biofilm microenvironment.

EPS in Microalgal Biofilms 
EPS is found in the matrix of other microbial biofilms such as microalgal biofilms. The formation of biofilm and structure of EPS share a lot of similarities with bacterial ones. The formation of Biofilm starts with reversible absorption of floating cells to the surface. Followed by production of EPS, the adsorption will get irreversible. EPS will colonize the cells at the surface with hydrogen bonding. Replication of early colonizers will be facilitated by the presence of organic molecules in the matrix which will provide nutrients to the algal cells . As the colonizers are reproducing, the biofilm grows and becomes a 3-dimensional structure. Microalgal biofilms consist of 90% EPS and 10% algal cells. Agal EPS has similar components to the bacterial one; it is made up of proteins, phospholipids, polysaccharides, nucleic acids, humic substances, uronic acids and some functional groups, such as phosphoric, carboxylic, hydroxyl and amino groups. Algal cells consume EPS as their source of energy and carbon. Furthermore, EPS protects them from dehydration and reinforces the adhesion of the cells to the surface. In algal biofilms, EPS has two sub-categories; soluble EPS (sEPS) and the bounded EPS (bEPS) with former being distributed in the medium and the latter being attached to the algal cells. Bounded EPS can be further subdivided to tightly bounded EPS (TB-EPS) and loosely bounded EPS (LB-EPS). Several factors contribute to the composition of EPS including species, substrate type, nutrient availability, temperature, pH and light intensity.

See also 
 Extracellular matrix in multi-cellular organisms
 Exopolymer
 Integrin
 Sea snot

References

External links 
 EPS, BioMineWiki 

Microbiology terms
Bacteria
Bacteriology
Environmental soil science
Membrane biology
Biological matter
Microbiology
Biomolecules
Polymers
Water treatment